State act, state action, or act of state may refer to:

Act of state, act of a sovereign state
State occasion
Exercise of the royal prerogative was formerly called an "act of state"
State actor, doctrine that only state actions are subject to regulation under the US Constitution
State action immunity doctrine, exemption from liability for engaging in antitrust violations